Baby Blues (also known as Cradle Will Fall) is a 2008 American horror film co-directed by Lars Jacobson and Amar Kaleka, based on the 2001 killings of five children by their mother Andrea Yates, although the film is set in the 1980s. It was filmed entirely in Savannah, Georgia by the company Neverending Light Productions.

Plot
Based on Andrea Yates and her family, the five children being drowned in the family bathroom by their mother.

In the film itself, which is set in a secluded family farm, the mother (Colleen Porch) suffers a psychotic break down due to postpartum depression and after her husband, a truck driver, hits the road again after only being home a day. It’s all too much for her and she snaps, begins to break things in the middle of dinner. She then calmly walks away with the baby to the upstairs bedroom.

Jimmy (Ridge Canipe), the eldest son, trying to keep his younger brother and sister calm, starts cleaning up, but soon he decides to check on his mother and discovers the horrible truth. His baby brother is dead, and she’s preparing to take care of the rest of her kids. Now hope for the family's survival rests on the shoulder of Jimmy, the eldest son and surrogate man of the house. After his mother tries to drown his sister and he knocks her out, Jimmy gets his brother onto a bike and tells him to ride for help while trying to get his sister to safety.

Using his wits and intricate knowledge of the farm, Jimmy must try to protect his siblings while fending off the woman he has always known and loved as his mother. Only one of the children survives as the mother stalks a further two of them down and kills them in typical slasher style. Jimmy manages to survive up until his father arrives back after hearing him on a radio transmission. The film then cuts to a hospital and Jimmy is set to come home. His father then tells Jimmy that his mother is also coming home, much to Jimmy's surprise. We are then shown the mother, stood pregnant and singing rock-a-bye baby.

Cast
Colleen Porch as Mom
Ridge Canipe as James "Jimmy" Williams Jr.
Joel Bryant as James Williams, Sr.
Kali Majors as Cathy Williams
Holden Thomas Maynard as Sammy Williams

Release
The film was released on August 5, 2008 in the United States and was subject to mediocre reviews, often criticising the mother's dialogue but praising the acting.On August 9, 2008 Baby Blues was released straight to DVD under the name Cradle Will Fall in the U.K.

References

External links

2008 films
2008 horror films
American slasher films
Films set on farms
Horror films based on actual events
2000s English-language films
2000s American films